Tu Mañana was a Puerto Rican breakfast television show that aired on the Univision Puerto Rico television network. The show debuted on March 11, 1991 and was aired on weekday mornings. On October 14, 2014, the show was cancelled as part of a restructuring of Univision Puerto Rico's operations that included the closure of its news department. With the sale of WLII-DT from Univision to Liberman Media Group the new owners have announced they intend to revive Tu Mañana in 2023.

History

Debuting on the air on March 11, 1991 Tu Mañana was WLII's (then known as Teleonce) venture into breakfast television. The show originally aired from 6:00 a.m. to 8:00 a.m. on weekday mornings from WLII's original studios in Puerta de Tierra, Puerto Rico and was hosted by Bruni Torres and Carlos Ochoteco. In 1999, Tu Mañana added an extra thirty minutes to their runtime with the show now airing from 5:30 a.m. to 8:00 a.m. 

In 2002, Univision entered into a local marketing agreement with Raycom Media to operate WLII and WSUR-TV. After the Univision integration, Las Noticias became Las Noticias Univision and acquired the branding of all other Univision O&O stations news broadcasts, subsequently Tu Mañana was rebranded as Tu Mañana Univision and during this period Elwood Cruz and Nuria Sebazco were assigned as co-anchors, a position they held until 2011.

In 2005, Univision moved the channel's operations from Puerta de Tiera to Guaynabo, Puerto Rico. WLII began broadcasting its local newscasts in high definition on September 26, 2010. In February 2012, it expanded its time slot to four hours (from 5:00am to 9:00am) and added new talents Gricel Mamery and Gredmarie Colon as their hosts. This new version of Tu Mañana focused less on news and more on entertainment with veteran anchor Ramon Enrique Torres in charge of short news segments at the top of each half hour of the show. Tu Mañana served as the lead in for ¡Despierta América! which has occupied WLII's 8 a.m. time slot since 2002.

On October 17, 2014 right as Tu Mañana was going off the air, employees at WLII-DT received word from Univision that their entire news department was closing on orders from the station's new Senior-Vice President and General Manager, Jaime Bauza. Employees were informed that that day's remaining newscast would not go on the air and were instructed to gather their belongings and leave the station as their positions had been terminated effective immediately. The news was broken to the public by reporter Daisy Sanchez who informed her twitter followers of the station's decision as it was announced to them. The closure of the news department effectively cancelled Tu Mañana ending a 23 year run and leaving rival station's WAPA-TV Noticentro Al Amanecer as the sole breakfast morning show airing in Puerto Rico as WKAQ-TV also had cancelled their morning newscast a few years prior. Over 100 employees lost their job on this day and Univision Puerto Rico abstained from producing any news content until 2018 when the station started producing Edición Digital out of their WOLE-DT studios in Aguadilla, Puerto Rico. WLII's news department officially re-opened on July 12, 2022 after Univision sold the station (and its repeaters) to Liberman Media Group, who promptly decided to relaunch the station's newscasts.     

On December 8, 2021 during the first TeleOnce upfront presentation it was announced that Tu Mañana would return in 2022, this however did not come to be and at their next upfront presentation on December 13, 2022, TeleOnce announced that Tu Mañana's return is now scheduled for "Late 2023".

Former on-air staff

Anchors
 Carlos Ochoteco, anchor (1991–1997)
 Cyd Marie Fleming, anchor (1991–1997)
 Pablo Romero Alonso, anchor
 Felipe Gómez, anchor
 Bruni Torres, anchor
 Yolly Vélez, anchor
 Nuria Sebazco, anchor (2002–2011)
 Roberto Arias, sports anchor
 Elwood Cruz - Anchor 2002- 2014
 Zugey Lamela - Anchor 2012-2014
 Susan Soltero - Weather

See also
 Breakfast television

References

External links
 Official link

1991 Puerto Rican television series debuts
2014 Puerto Rican television series endings
1990s Puerto Rican television series
2000s Puerto Rican television series
2010s Puerto Rican television series
Puerto Rican television series